Shaheed  ( ,  ,   ) denotes a martyr in Islam. The word is used frequently in the Quran in the generic sense of "witness" but only once in the sense of "martyr" (i.e. one who dies for his faith); the latter sense acquires wider usage in the hadith.

The term is commonly used as a posthumous title for those who are considered to have accepted or even consciously sought out their own death in order to bear witness to their beliefs. Like the English-language word martyr, in the 20th century, the word shahid came to have both religious and non-religious connotations, and has often been used to describe those who died for non-religious ideological causes. This suggests that there is no single fixed and immutable concept of martyrdom among Muslims and Sikhs. It is also used in Sikhism.

Etymology
In Arabic, the word shahid means "witness". Its development closely parallels that of the Greek word martys (also "martyr" in the New Testament), the origin of the term martyr.

Quranic references
A shahid is considered one whose place in Paradise is promised according to these verses in the Quran:

The Quranic passage that follows is the source of the concept of Muslim martyrs being promised Paradise:

Hadiths

The importance of faith is highlighted in the following hadith:

It is thus not the outcome that determines the placement in Heaven but rather the intention.

Nonetheless, Paradise for a shahid is a popular concept in the Islamic tradition according to Hadith, and the attainment of this title is honorific.

The Prophet Muhammad is reported to have said these words about martyrdom:

Several hadith also indicate the nature of a shahid's life in Paradise. Shahids are thought to attain the highest level of Paradise, the Paradise of al-Firdous.

Furthermore, Samura narrated:

There are at least five different kinds of martyrs according to hadith.

One who dies protecting his property is also considered a martyr according to Hadith:

While the Qur'an does not indicate much about martyrs' death and funeral, the hadith provides some information on this topic. For example, martyrs are to be buried two in one grave in their blood, without being washed or having a funeral prayer held for them. The following Hadith highlight this:

Sikhism 

The word shahid is also found in Sikhism, a religion founded by Guru Nanak in the northwest part of the Indian subcontinent (now Pakistan and India). It means a martyr.

The term was borrowed from the Islamic culture in Punjab when Sikhism was founded, and before the start of the British Raj it referred to the Sikh people who met death at the hands of oppressors. Another related term is shahid-ganj, which means a "place of martyrdom".

The most discussed shahid in Sikhism have been two of their Gurus, namely Guru Arjan and Guru Tegh Bahadur for defying Islamic rulers and refusing to convert to Islam. Guru Arjan was arrested under the orders of the Mughal Emperor Jahangir and asked to convert to Islam. He refused, was tortured and executed in 1606 CE. Historical records and the Sikh tradition are unclear whether Guru Arjan was executed by drowning or died during torture. His martyrdom, that is becoming a shahid, is considered a watershed event in the history of Sikhism.

Guru Tegh Bahadur's martyrdom resulted from refusing to convert and for resisting the forced conversions of Hindus in Kashmir to Islam because he believed in freedom of conscience and human rights. He was publicly beheaded in 1675 on the orders of Mughal emperor Aurangzeb in Delhi. Gurudwara Sis Ganj Sahib in Delhi marks the shahid-ganj, or place of execution of the Guru.

The Sikh have other major pilgrimage sites, such as the shahid-ganj in Sirhind, where two sons of Guru Gobind Singh were bricked alive by Mughal Empire army in retaliation of their father's resistance. In Muktsar, near a lake is a shahid-ganj dedicated to forty men who died defending Guru Gobind Singh.

Modern usage 
In the course of the eighteenth century, there were several wars of independence within the colonial territories of the Muslim World. Many of the soldiers who died during these conflicts were given the title shahid upon their burial. Various Muslims have died under fascist and communist regimes during the course of the twentieth century and as well as more recent genocides including the Bosnian genocide, Rohingya genocide, and Uyghur genocide. Massacres against Muslims have also occurred such as the Christchurch mosque shootings in New Zealand in 2019.

A Muslim who is killed defending his or her property is considered a martyr. For example, in Pakistan and India the word "shaheed" is used to denote martyrs who have died in the way of Islam or in the defence of their nation.

Women
A woman is considered "shahida" if she dies during the fulfillment of a religious commandment. A woman can also be considered a martyr if she dies during childbirth. There are examples of women fighting in war such as Nusaybah bint Ka'ab. The first martyr (male or female) in Islam was Sumayyah bint Khayyat, who was executed for her conversion to Islam. She died after Abu Jahl, an anti-Muslim leader of the Quraysh stabbed her in the abdomen. Though her name is not common in the modern Muslim dialogue, ancient Islamic literature makes note of the events at the end of her life.

Other religions
Over a period of time, the word "shahid" began to be used by non-Muslims such as Arab Christians to denote their own martyrs. So the word is still used by Christians in Arab-speaking countries, including the names of churches. Examples are the Forty Martyrs Cathedral in Aleppo, Syria and the Saint George the Martyr Cathedral in Damascus.

In South Asia, Hindus adopted the word "shahid" as a synonym to the Sanskrit word "hutātmā" (हुतात्मा in Devanagari and হুতাত্মা in Bengali; हुत् and হুত্ hut = sacrificing, आत्मा and আত্মা ātmā = soul, thus hutātmā = sacrificing soul / martyr), to denote Hindu martyrs.

See also
 Istishhad, in Islam, the act of martyrdom or the seeking of martyrdom
 Jihad, an Islamic religious duty, meaning struggle
 Martyrdom in Judaism
 Martyrdom in Christianity
 Martyrdom in Sikhism
 Martyrdom video, a video recording the acts of Islamic martyrs
 Persecution of Muslims
 Shahada, the Islamic creed
 Shahid (name)
 Shahidka, a term for Islamist Chechen female suicide bombers

References and footnotes

External links 
 

 
Arabic words and phrases
Islamic terminology
Sikh terminology